DJ-Kicks: Lone is a DJ mix album by English musician Lone. It was released on 6 October 2017 through Studio !K7 independent record label as part of their DJ-Kicks series.

Track listing

References

DJ-Kicks albums
2017 compilation albums